The Village Voice Film Poll was an annual polling by The Village Voice film section of more than 100 major film critics for alternative media sources. Although the majority of the critics work for the alt-weeklies, a number are former Voice critics who now work for the mainstream media or have retired. It was compiled every year from top 10 lists, best performance lists, and votes for other categories. The poll results were printed alongside the annotated top 10 lists of J. Hoberman, Dennis Lim and Michael Atkinson.

The 1999 poll included votes for Best Film of the Decade (Safe), Best Director of the Decade (Hou Hsiao-hsien), and Best Film of the Century (Citizen Kane).

In the 2009 poll, Mulholland Drive was voted the best film of the decade.

The Village Voice ceased publication altogether in August 2018. However, much like the Village Voice's own Pazz & Jop poll, the Film Poll has continued on through different publications since the newspaper ended. Film critic Mike D'Angelo has continued to survey frequent contributors of the poll for the Best Film category. The results were published in Slate in 2018 and Filmmaker in 2019 and 2020.

Winners

Best Film
 1999: Being John Malkovich
 2000: Beau Travail
 2001: Mulholland Drive
 2002: Far from Heaven
 2003: Lost in Translation
 2004: Before Sunset
 2005: A History of Violence
 2006: Army of Shadows
 2007: There Will Be Blood
 2008: WALL-E
 2009: The Hurt Locker
 2010: The Social Network
 2011: The Tree of Life
 2012: The Master
 2013: Inside Llewyn Davis
 2014: Boyhood
 2015: Mad Max: Fury Road
 2016: Moonlight
 2017: Phantom Thread
 2018: First Reformed
 2019: The Irishman
 2020: First Cow

Best Director
 1999: Mike Leigh – Topsy-Turvy
 2000: Edward Yang – Yi Yi
 2001: David Lynch – Mulholland Drive
 2002: Todd Haynes – Far from Heaven
 2003: Gus Van Sant – Elephant
 2004: Richard Linklater – Before Sunset
 2005: David Cronenberg – A History of Violence
 2010: Olivier Assayas – Carlos
 2011: Terrence Malick – The Tree of Life
 2012: Paul Thomas Anderson – The Master
 2013: Steve McQueen – 12 Years a Slave
 2014: Richard Linklater – Boyhood
 2015: George Miller – Mad Max: Fury Road
 2016: Barry Jenkins – Moonlight
 2017: Paul Thomas Anderson – Phantom Thread

Best Lead Performance
 1999: Hilary Swank – Boys Don't Cry
 2000: Gillian Anderson – The House of Mirth
 2001: Naomi Watts – Mulholland Drive
 2002: Julianne Moore – Far from Heaven
 2003: Bill Murray – Lost in Translation
 2004: Imelda Staunton – Vera Drake
 2005: Heath Ledger – Brokeback Mountain
 2017: Saoirse Ronan – Lady Bird

Best Actor
 2006: Ryan Gosling – Half Nelson
 2007: Daniel Day-Lewis – There Will Be Blood
 2008: Sean Penn – Milk
 2009: Jeremy Renner – The Hurt Locker
 2010: Jesse Eisenberg – The Social Network
 2011: Michael Shannon – Take Shelter
 2012: Joaquin Phoenix – The Master
 2013: Chiwetel Ejiofor – 12 Years a Slave
 2014: Jake Gyllenhaal – Nightcrawler
 2015: Géza Röhrig – Son of Saul
 2016: Casey Affleck – Manchester by the Sea

Best Actress
 2006: Helen Mirren – The Queen
 2007: Anamaria Marinca – 4 Months, 3 Weeks and 2 Days
 2008: Sally Hawkins – Happy-Go-Lucky
 2009: Tilda Swinton – Julia
 2010: Jennifer Lawrence – Winter's Bone
 2011: Anna Paquin – Margaret
 2012: Rachel Weisz – The Deep Blue Sea
 2013: Adèle Exarchopoulos – Blue Is the Warmest Colour
 2014: Marion Cotillard – Two Days, One Night and The Immigrant
 2015: Charlotte Rampling – 45 Years
 2016: Isabelle Huppert – Elle

Best Supporting Performance
 1999: Chloë Sevigny – Boys Don't Cry
 2000: Benicio del Toro – Traffic
 2001: Steve Buscemi – Ghost World
 2002: Chris Cooper – Adaptation.
 2003: Peter Sarsgaard – Shattered Glass
 2004: Mark Wahlberg – I Heart Huckabees
 2005: Maria Bello – A History of Violence
 2017: Laurie Metcalf – Lady Bird

Best Supporting Actor
 2006: Jackie Earle Haley – Little Children
 2007: Javier Bardem – No Country for Old Men
 2008: Heath Ledger – The Dark Knight
 2009: Christoph Waltz – Inglourious Basterds
 2010: John Hawkes – Winter's Bone
 2011: Albert Brooks – Drive
 2012: Matthew McConaughey – Magic Mike
 2013: James Franco – Spring Breakers
 2014: J. K. Simmons – Whiplash
 2015: Mark Rylance – Bridge of Spies
 2016: Mahershala Ali – Moonlight

Best Supporting Actress
 2006: Luminița Gheorghiu – The Death of Mr. Lazarescu
 2007: Cate Blanchett – I'm Not There
 2008: Penélope Cruz – Vicky Cristina Barcelona
 2009: Mo'Nique – Precious
 2010: Jacki Weaver – Animal Kingdom
 2011: Jeannie Berlin – Margaret
 2012: Amy Adams – The Master
 2013: Lupita Nyong'o – 12 Years a Slave
 2014: Patricia Arquette – Boyhood
 2015: Kristen Stewart – Clouds of Sils Maria
 2016: Lily Gladstone – Certain Women

Best Documentary
 2001: The Gleaners and I
 2002: Bowling for Columbine
 2003: The Fog of War: Eleven Lessons from the Life of Robert S. McNamara
 2004: Los Angeles Plays Itself
 2005: Grizzly Man
 2006: Darwin's Nightmare
 2007: No End in Sight
 2008: Man on Wire
 2009: Anvil! The Story of Anvil
 2010: Exit Through the Gift Shop
 2011: The Interrupters
 2012: This Is Not a Film
 2013: The Act of Killing
 2014: Citizenfour
 2015: The Look of Silence
 2016: O.J.: Made in America
 2017: Faces Places

References

External links
 Official website
 Take Seven Film Poll Official List of Poll Results and Essays for 2005 with links to previous polls

American film awards
The Village Voice